Calamotropha afra is a moth in the family Crambidae. It was described by Graziano Bassi in 1986. It is found in Zambia.

References

Crambinae
Moths described in 1986